Perth Road Village is a community in Ontario. It is named for the Perth Road where it is located, which was one of the first roads to connect Kingston, Ontario on Lake Ontario to the then-major inland community of Perth, Ontario.

Communities in Frontenac County